Events from the year 1735 in Canada.

Incumbents
French Monarch: Louis XV
British and Irish Monarch: George II

Governors
Governor General of New France: Charles de la Boische, Marquis de Beauharnois
Colonial Governor of Louisiana: Jean-Baptiste le Moyne de Bienville
Governor of Nova Scotia: Lawrence Armstrong
Commodore-Governor of Newfoundland: Jean-Baptiste Le Moyne de Bienville

Events
 Father Jean-Pierre Aulneau came to Fort St. Charles with Pierre La Vérendrye to carry out his duties as a missionary.

Births

Full date unknown
 Alexander McKee, agent for the Indian Department (died 1799)

Deaths

Historical documents
Hudson's Bay Company charter allows it to impose its sovereignty (including making war) in lands "not possess'd by any Christian Power"
HBC employee describes Indigenous people's divination, and how his boss turned to them in 1735 when ship from England was overdue
Long description of activities and Christian customs of Haudenosaunee at Kahnawake (Note: racial stereotypes)
Pierre de la Vérendrye informs Gov. Beauharnois that Fort Maurepas on Red River near Lake Winnipeg has been built
Jesuit missionary afraid to go 3,600 miles to live alone with uncontacted Indigenous people "who dwell in holes" (Note: "savages" used)
Panis subject to enslavement in Canada by common practice, not formal law, and can be granted freedom (Note: "savages" used)
Intendant Gilles Hocquart reports two executions, for abduction and violence against six-year-old and for enslaved man's domestic thievery
Master carpenter to be paid for major job in Montreal with merchandise, four bottles of eau de vie, 30 bushels of wheat and cash
Brief details of defences and fishing fleets of Louisbourg and other French settlements in region
Fishers working banks near Canso may have single sloop or schooner catching 400-500 quintals or send out six to twelve boats or more
Previous complaints about poorly cured Canso fish arise because ships load fish before salt curing process is complete
Nova Scotia lieutenant governor Armstrong again repeats his requests for increased strength against subject Acadians and nearby French
Detailed reasons for settling Nova Scotia with numerous Protestants to protect northern limit of continental colonies against French
Detailed proposal for establishing settlers and civil government in Nova Scotia through trusteeship of "honble. and experienced persons"
Petition for poor London craftsmen to be settled in Nova Scotia with civil government (tied to petition for salt works in Bahamas)
Armstrong visits Minas and finds locals submissive "only from policy" while "inciting the Indians [—] those poor ignorant wretches"
"Stocks are Impaired & greatly deminished by such pernicious proceedings" - exporting cattle prohibited except through Annapolis Royal or Canso
Acadian deputies can't, as Catholics, execute Council orders, which it fixes by having them made constables "in their own privite affairs"
Council committee sets cordwood price after Armstrong declares overcharging French are entitled only to wood they personally need
"Some people here tell stories of Indians have been seen some years ago[...]nor did I see one person in Newfoundland had ever seen an Indian"
"This day was laid the first Stone of the Fortification here [in Schenectady, New York] under the discharge of the great Guns"
New York governor Cosby "laid hold of the people's apprehensions" to convince them money had to be spent on defence, no matter their "poverty"
Board of Trade suggests to Privy Council that Massachusetts pay for defences of Pemaquid, which has only eastern fort to check French
Gov. Belcher reports success in peace talks with "Cagnawagas," and suggests outlawing private trading to end cheating done to "Eastern Indians"

References 

 
Canada
35